Emídio Rafael Augusto Silva (born 24 January 1986), known as Rafael, is a retired Portuguese footballer who played as a left back.

In a career marred by injuries after signing for Porto in 2010, he amassed Primeira Liga totals of 58 matches and three goals over six seasons, also appearing for Académica (two stints), Braga and Estoril in the competition. In the Segunda Liga, he scored twice from 63 appearances.

Club career
Born in Lisbon, Rafael spent six years with local Sporting CP – youth years comprised – but never represented its first team officially. On loan, he made his senior debut in the third division, spending one season apiece with Casa Pia A.C. and Real S.C. (both in the Lisbon area) and being released in 2007.

Subsequently, Rafael signed for Portimonense S.C. in the second level, being first-choice in his first season and regularly used in the following. In 2009–10, he made his Primeira Liga debut with Académica de Coimbra, his first appearance in the competition being on 13 September 2009 in a 1–2 away loss against S.C. Olhanense; he only missed four league games, scoring once as the Students easily retained their division status.

In the ensuing off-season, Rafael followed manager André Villas-Boas to FC Porto after agreeing to a three-year contract. He rarely made the list of 18 in the first months at his new club, but profited from a run of injuries in the first team to gain more playing time. On 29 January 2011, he scored in a 2–2 draw at Gil Vicente F.C. for the campaign's Portuguese League Cup, but also sustained an horrific last-minute injury to his foot, being sidelined for well more than one year; he finished his first year with the northerners with 11 competitive games, scoring two goals.

In January 2013, Rafael signed with S.C. Braga, joining until the end of the season with the possibility of a three-year extension. After his contract expired, he moved to Platanias F.C. of the Superleague Greece; however, just six months later, he returned to Portugal and agreed to one-and-a-half-year deal with G.D. Estoril Praia.

On 8 June 2015, free agent Rafael rejoined Académica for two years. On 10 March 2017, after not being able to overcome his recurring injury problems, the 31-year-old announced his retirement and began working for scouting agency Gold World Stars.

Honours
Porto
Primeira Liga: 2010–11
Taça de Portugal: 2010–11

References

External links

1986 births
Living people
Footballers from Lisbon
Portuguese footballers
Association football defenders
Primeira Liga players
Liga Portugal 2 players
Segunda Divisão players
Sporting CP footballers
Casa Pia A.C. players
Real S.C. players
Portimonense S.C. players
Associação Académica de Coimbra – O.A.F. players
FC Porto players
S.C. Braga players
S.C. Braga B players
G.D. Estoril Praia players
Super League Greece players
Platanias F.C. players
Portugal youth international footballers
Portuguese expatriate footballers
Expatriate footballers in Greece
Portuguese expatriate sportspeople in Greece